Central Union Elementary School District is a public school district based in Kings County, California.

References

External links
 

School districts in Kings County, California